Guangzhou University (GU) is a state university in Guangzhou, capital of Guangdong province, China.

The university is made up of two campuses. The major campus is located in Guangzhou Higher Education Mega Center (HEMC, geographically called Xiaoguwei Island), covering a total area of 131.7 hectares, with a building space of 596,000 square meters. The other campus is located in downtown (GuiHuaGang) of Guangzhou, covering 20 hectares.

The university is dually affiliated to Guangzhou Municipal Government and Guangdong Provincial Government. The funding for the university is subject to Guangzhou Municipal Government.

History 
Guangzhou University was reestablished in July 2000 by the Chinese Ministry of Education. It was a merger of five tertiary institutions previously known as Guangzhou Normal University (广州师范学院), South China Institute of Construction (华南建设学院), Guangzhou University (广州大学), Guangzhou Junior Teachers' College (广州高等专科学校), and Guangzhou Institute of Education (广州教育学院).
The university is fully committed to consolidating and expanding its undergraduate program, graduate programs and international students program. The university comprises 27 schools (department). It offers 87 undergraduate programs with coverage of ten disciplinary fields, including philosophy, history, literature, law, pedagogy, art, science, engineering, management and economics. Currently, the university is authorized to run 3 PhD programs with 25 grade-2 subjects, 26 graduate programs with 95 grade-2 subjects. In addition, the university offers 9 professional graduate programs in 36 fields, including pedagogy, engineering, physical education, art and international Chinese language teaching.

The university has a teaching and research staff of 1475, including two academician of the Chinese Academy of Sciences and one academician of Chinese Academy of Engineering, 290 full-time professors and 604 full-time associate professors. The number of the full-time graduates and undergraduates is over 23,000.

The university is actively undertaking the national and provincial research programs, such as national “973”and “863” projects. It has established more than 30 research institutes or centers specializing in a wide range of subjects, including Interdisciplinary Research Center, Earthquake Engineering Research Test Center, Human Right Research Center, Research Institute for Computer Science & Software etc.
International exchange and cooperation have always been a priority work of the university. Up to 2011, the university has established the partnership with more than 100 overseas institutions. The university is available for international students to study Chinese and apply for degree study. It also enrolls students from Hong Kong, Macao and Taiwan as well.

In the new age, the university is engaged in making a contribution to the development of Guangzhou, Guangdong Province as well as that of China. The goal of the university is to mold itself as a comprehensive university with a unique characteristic and ranks in a leading position among the universities of similar type.

Campus

As a manifestation of GU's core spirit, the Campus Culture of GU guarantees a good academic and cultural atmosphere on campus. To promote the construction of quality education, cultural activities on campus are organized on the basis of perfect combinations between science and humanity, between high taste cultural activities and students’ comprehensive quality cultivation.

Based on the principles of Students Art Troupe, GU carries on various cultural activities, including Culture and Art Festivals on Campus, Chinese Classics Reading, Classic Movies Appreciation, and Elegant Art Appreciation. In addition, the university organizes various contests including Debate, Image Design, Career Design, Singing and Dancing, Hosting, etc., and builds a series of school cultural activity brands.

There are now eighty student associations with more than 12,000 members at GU. These associations cover a range of subjects including humanities, technology, public service, arts, and P.E. etc. Each year, there is a cultural month reserved for activities of the associations in which student associations play an important role in moral education, science enlightenment, career guidance, and volunteer service.

Academic reputation and goal

The new Guangzhou University is named after the third biggest city in China (Guangzhou) and was established in July 2000. It is actively undertaking the national and provincial research programs in recent years, such as national “973”and “863” projects.  The University Ranking on Academic Performance publications, authored by scholars from the Middle East Technical University in Turkey and co-contributed by European scholars from France, Netherlands and the United Kingdom ranked Guangzhou University at#153 out of the 183 nationally China and #1516 in ranking globally out of all the places of higher institutions in that category.  In the new age, the university is engaged in making a contribution to the community. The goal of the university is to mold itself as a comprehensive university with a characteristic and ranks in a leading position among the universities of similar type.

Courses

While the undergraduate programs remain the dominant focus of its operation, GU also runs postgraduate programs. The university run 42 postgraduate programs and 62 undergraduate programs in eight fields of study including Literature, Science, Engineering, Economics, Management, Law, Education and History.

Departments and schools

School of Architecture and Urban Planning
 Architecture
 Architecture(Environment Design Orientation)
 City Planning
 City Planning(Landscape Orientation)

School of Civil Engineering
 Building Environment and Energy Utilization Engineering
 Civil Engineering
 Traffic Engineering
 Water-supply and Drainage Science and Engineering
School of Business
 Business Administration (Cooperative Program) (Experimental)
 Business Administration
 Electronic Commerce
 Engineering Management
 Human Resource Management
 Logistics Management
 Marketing
School of Law
 Law(Lawyer Orientation)
 Law
School of Public Administration
 Administrative Management
 Management of Public Services (Urban Management Orientation included)
 Social Work

School of Education (Teachers’ School)
 Applied Psychology
 Educational Technology (Teacher's school)
 Pedagogy (Chinese Teaching in Primary School)
 Pre-school Education
 Psychology (Teacher Education)

School of Humanities
 Chinese Language and Literature
 History
 Teaching Chinese as a Foreign Language
School of Journalism and Communication
 Advertising
 Broadcast and Host ( Mandarin﹠Cantonese )
 Broadcasting Science (Network Communication)
 Radio and Television Broadcasting
 Radio-TV Program Production and Direction

School of Foreign Studies
 French Language
 English Language
 Japanese Language
School of Music and Dance
 Choreography
 Musicology

School of Fine Art and Artistic Design
 Visual Communication Design
 Painting
 Environmental Design
 Fine Arts
 Product Design
 Clothing and Fashion Design (Including Clothing Model Perform)
 Animation

School of Chemistry and Chemical Engineering
 Chemical Engineering
 Chemistry
 Food Science and Engineering
School of Mathematics and Information Sciences
 Information and Computing Science
 Information Security
 Mathematics and Applied Mathematics

School of Physics and Electronic Engineering
 Electronic Information Science and Technology
 Internet of Things Engineering
 Optoelectronic Information Engineering (Optoelectronic Testing Orientation Included)
 Physics (Education)
School of Geographic Sciences
 Geographic Information Education
 Geographic Science Education
 Human Geography﹠Urban and Rural Planning
 Physical Geography and Resource Environment

School of Electro-Mechanical Engineering
 Mechanical Design, Manufacture, and Automation
 Electrical Engineering and Automation
 Electronic Information Engineering
 Industrial Design
 Telecommunications Engineering
School of Computer Science & Education Software
 Computer Science and Technology
 Network Engineering
 Software Engineering
School of Life Science
 Biological Engineering
 Biological Science
 Biotechnology

School of Environmental Engineering
 Environmental Engineering
 Environmental Science
School of Tourism (Sino-French School of Tourism)
 Exhibition Economy Management
 Tourism Management (Domestic programs)
 Tourism Management (Sino-France project)
School of Physical Education
 Administrative Management
 Management of Public Services (Urban Management Orientation included)
 Social Work
School of Politics and Civic Education
 Ideological and Political Education
School of Economic and Statistics

School of International Education

School of Teacher Training

School of Basic Education

School of Modern Industry

CIBT International College

Wesleyan College

Staff and students 
GU has a staff of 2,588 including one academic scholar from the Chinese Academy of Science, one academic scholar from the China Institute of Engineering, four academic scholars employed on a part-time basis, 20 supervisors of doctoral students, 130 full-time  professors, 567 associate professors; of whom all 100 are Ph.D holders, 32 who have been awarded the state Council Special Allowances, 14 provincial and municipal level experts. The University's current full-time postgraduates, undergraduates and diploma students number 17,000. The University enrolls students mainly from Guangdong Province and Guangzhou, but also admits students from 11 other provinces, Hong Kong, Macao and also from overseas.

Research centres and other partnerships 
The University has 57 research institutes and centers specializing in wide range of fields including the Institute of Educational Software, the Earthquake Engineering Research and TestCenter, the Institute of Educational Sciences, and the Institute of Advanced Manufacturing Technology.

GU has also established a number of cooperative educational establishments including the College of Textile and Garment, the College of Urban Construction Engineering, the College of Technology and Trade, Sontian College, Hua Ruan Software College, the School of Municipal Works and Construction. GU has established partnerships in a wide range of disciplines with universities and academic institutions of the United States, Australia, France, Russia, Italy, South Korea, Japan, Sweden, and the Chinese-speaking region including Taiwan, Hong Kong and Macau.

Prospects 
With a history of over 10 years, and graduate programs since 2000, Guangzhou University has produced a large number of qualified talent for China and for Guangdong Province's social, economic, and technological development. The construction of the Guangzhou Higher Education Mega Center on Xiaoguwei Island (小谷圍島) is in progress.

References

External links 
 Official website 
 Official website 

 
Universities and colleges in Guangzhou
Guangzhou Higher Education Mega Center
Educational institutions established in 2000
2000 establishments in China